16 Bit was an Italian rock band founded in the town of Caserta in 2004. The group was founded by Fabio Verzillo, Dario Licciardi, Nando Brunetti, Roberto Celentano, and Antonio De Francesco.

Discography and videography
93 min Film: Animanera 2008
Video: 100 metri dal paradiso 2010
16 Bit, album by 16 Bit 2010
Fiammifero
E Noi
Baby Queen
In una Lacrima
Nel Kaos
Libera Maria
Resta Perche'
Sono Fuori
Mentre Vai Via
Anima Nera

References

Italian musical groups